Keyunta Dawson (born September 13, 1985) is a former American football linebacker and defensive end. He was drafted by the Indianapolis Colts in the seventh round of the 2007 NFL Draft. Dawson played college football at Texas Tech University.

College career 
In college, Dawson played defensive end for the Texas Tech Red Raiders.

Professional career
After spending his first four seasons with the Colts, Dawson signed with the Detroit Lions. He was released by the Lions on September 3, 2011. Dawson was re-signed by the Lions on November 30, 2011, but then released about a month later. On January 6, 2012, the Tennessee Titans signed Dawson. After appearing in only three games, Dawson was placed on injured reserve with a hamstring injury. On March 7, 2013, the Titans re-signed Dawson to a one-year contract.  The Titans released Dawson on October 5, 2013 to make room for quarterback Rusty Smith.  On October 8, 2013, he signed with the Saints.

References

1985 births
Living people
Players of American football from Shreveport, Louisiana
American football defensive ends
Evangel Christian Academy alumni
Texas Tech Red Raiders football players
Indianapolis Colts players
Detroit Lions players
Tennessee Titans players
New Orleans Saints players